Senator Jansen may refer to:

Mark Jansen (politician) (fl. 2000s–2010s), Michigan State Senate
Peter Jansen (politician) (1852–1923), Nebraska State Senate
Charlie Janssen (born 1971), Nebraska State Senate
Ray Janssen (born 1937), Nebraska State Senate